Robert Vincent (born April 13, 1956) is a Canadian politician, formerly a Bloc Québécois Member of Parliament for the riding of Shefford.

Born in Granby, Quebec, he was a foreman and union advisor before he was first elected in 2004.

Electoral record (partial)

References
 

1956 births
Living people
Bloc Québécois MPs
Members of the House of Commons of Canada from Quebec
People from Granby, Quebec
21st-century Canadian politicians